GT Advance 3: Pro Concept Racing, known in Japan as , is a racing game developed by MTO and published by THQ for the Game Boy Advance. It is the sequel to GT Advance 2: Rally Racing, based heavily on the gameplay from GT Advance Championship Racing, and the third game in the GT Advance series.

Gameplay
The game reportedly mixes the first two games of the series—it has the city environments and paved streets of the first game, but the physics engine is slippery, much like the second, changing the strategy drastically from GT Advance Championship Racing. There are 97 cars available, and all are customizable. Also added to the game is the "Drift Combo" mode, in which the player needs to drift a certain number of times within a set time limit to unlock a new car.

Development
GT Advance 3: Pro Concept Racing was first announced in November 2002 to be under development. The following year in February, THQ released updated information regarding the game along with screenshots, showing the game's increased graphical power over its predecessors.

Reception

The game received "average" reviews according to the review aggregation website Metacritic. GameSpot called GT Advance 3: Pro Concept Racing as a spicier version of the original GT Advance that was released when the Game Boy Advance launched in June 2001. IGN was also positive of the game, but noted that other Game Boy Advance games like Colin McRae Rally 2.0 and Moto Racer Advance have better graphics systems. In Japan, Famitsu gave it a score of 29 out of 40.

References

External links
 

2002 video games
Game Boy Advance games
Game Boy Advance-only games
MTO (video game company) games
Multiplayer and single-player video games
Racing video games
THQ games
Video games developed in Japan